John III ( – 1331), Count of Dreux, was the second son of John II of Dreux and of Jeanne of Beaujeu.

Marriage and family 
John succeeded his elder brother Robert in 1329. Around that time, he married Ida, daughter of Guy II, lord of Rosny, and of Laura of Ponthieu. As the marriage was childless, his brother, Peter succeeded him upon his death in 1331.

References

Counts of Dreux
1295 births
1331 deaths
House of Dreux